This is a list of the mammal species recorded in the Solomon Islands archipelago. The geographical area covered by this article refers to the archipelago of the Solomon Islands, which includes Bougainville Island, a province of Papua New Guinea, as well as the group of islands that make up the nation state of Solomon Islands. Within this area there are sixty-three mammal species of which four are critically endangered, one is endangered, and fifteen are vulnerable.

Three of the species listed for the Solomon Islands are considered to be extinct.

The marine mammals of the order Cetacea that have been identified in the Pacific is described in the literature review by Miller (2006) and by the Secretariat of the Pacific Regional Environment Programme (SPREP). A revision of the list of cetaceans reported in the ocean surrounding the Solomon Islands was carried by Miller (2009).

The following tags are used to highlight each species' conservation status as assessed by the International Union for Conservation of Nature:

Order: Sirenia (manatees and dugongs) 

Sirenia is an order of fully aquatic, herbivorous mammals that inhabit rivers, estuaries, coastal marine waters, swamps, and marine wetlands. All four species are endangered.

Family: Dugongidae
Genus: Dugong
Dugong, Dugong dugon VU

Order: Rodentia (rodents) 
Rodents make up the largest order of mammals, with over 40% of mammalian species. They have two incisors in the upper and lower jaw which grow continually and must be kept short by gnawing.

Suborder: Myomorpha
Family: Muridae (mice, rats, gerbils, etc.)
Subfamily: Murinae
Genus: Rattus
 Spiny rat, Rattus praetor LC
Genus: Solomys
 Poncelet's naked-tailed rat, Solomys ponceleti EN
 Florida naked-tailed rat, Solomys salamonis VU
 Bougainville naked-tailed rat, Solomys salebrosus EN
 Isabel naked-tailed rat, Solomys sapientis VU
Genus: Uromys
 Emperor rat, Uromys imperator EX
 Guadalcanal rat, Uromys porculus EX
 King rat, Uromys rex CR

Order: Chiroptera (bats) 
The bats' most distinguishing feature is that their forelimbs are developed as wings, making them the only mammals capable of flight. Bat species account for about 20% of all mammals.

Family: Pteropodidae (flying foxes, Old World fruit bats)
Subfamily: Pteropodinae
Genus: Dobsonia
 Solomon's naked-backed fruit bat, Dobsonia inermis LC
Genus: Nyctimene
 Common tube-nosed fruit bat, Nyctimene albiventer LC
 Island tube-nosed fruit bat, Nyctimene major LC
 Malaita tube-nosed fruit bat, Nyctimene malaitensis VU
 Nendo tube-nosed fruit bat, Nyctimene sanctacrucis EX
 Umboi tube-nosed fruit bat, Nyctimene vizcaccia LC
Genus: Pteralopex
 Bougainville monkey-faced bat, Pteralopex anceps CR
 Guadalcanal monkey-faced bat, Pteralopex atrata CR
 Montane monkey-faced bat, Pteralopex pulchra CR
 New Georgian monkey-faced bat, Pteralopex taki EN
Genus: Pteropus
 Admiralty flying-fox, Pteropus admiralitatum LC
 Ontong Java flying fox, Pteropus howensis VU
 Small flying-fox, Pteropus hypomelanus LC
 Lesser flying-fox, Pteropus mahaganus VU
 Temotu flying fox, Pteropus nitendiensis VU
 Solomons flying-fox, Pteropus rayneri NT
 Santa Cruz flying fox, Pteropus sanctacrucis VU
 Insular flying-fox, Pteropus tonganus LC
 Vanikoro flying fox, Pteropus tuberculatus VU
 Dwarf flying fox, Pteropus woodfordi VU
Subfamily: Macroglossinae
Genus: Macroglossus
 Long-tongued nectar bat, Macroglossus minimus LC
Genus: Melonycteris
 Orange fruit bat, Melonycteris aurantius VU
 Fardoulis's blossom bat, Melonycteris fardoulisi VU
 Woodford's fruit bat, Melonycteris woodfordi LC
Family: Vespertilionidae
Subfamily: Myotinae
Genus: Myotis
 Large-footed bat, Myotis adversus LC
Subfamily: Vespertilioninae
Genus: Pipistrellus
 Angulate pipistrelle, Pipistrellus angulatus LC
Subfamily: Miniopterinae
Genus: Miniopterus
 Intermediate long-fingered bat, Miniopterus medius LC
 Schreibers' long-fingered bat, Miniopterus schreibersii LC
 Great bent-winged bat, Miniopterus tristis LC
Family: Molossidae
Genus: Chaerephon
 Solomons mastiff bat, Chaerephon solomonis LC
Family: Emballonuridae
Genus: Emballonura
 Large-eared sheath-tailed bat, Emballonura dianae VU
 Raffray's sheath-tailed bat, Emballonura raffrayana LC
Genus: Mosia
 Dark sheath-tailed bat, Mosia nigrescens LC
Genus: Saccolaimus
 Naked-rumped pouched bat, Saccolaimus saccolaimus LC
Family: Rhinolophidae
Subfamily: Hipposiderinae
Genus: Anthops
 Flower-faced bat, Anthops ornatus VU
Genus: Aselliscus
 Temminck's trident bat, Aselliscus tricuspidatus LC
Genus: Hipposideros
 Spurred roundleaf bat, Hipposideros calcaratus LC
 Makira roundleaf bat, Hipposideros demissus VU
 Fierce roundleaf bat, Hipposideros dinops DD

Order: Diprotodontia (marsupials) 
The Diprotodontia are an order of about 125 species of marsupial mammals including the kangaroos, wallabies, possums, koala, wombats, and many others.

Suborder: Phalangeriformes
Family: Phalangeridae
Genus: Phalanger
 Northern common cuscus, Phalanger orientalis LC (Introduced)
Genus: Spilocuscus
 Common spotted cuscus, Spilocuscus maculatus LC
Family: Pseudocheiridae
Genus: Pseudochirulus
 Lowland ringtail possum, Pseudochirulus canescens LC
Genus: Pseudochirops
 Golden ringtail possum, Pseudochirops corrinae NT
Family: Petauridae
Genus: Dactylopsila
 Striped possum, Dactylopsila trivirgata LC
Genus: Petaurus
 Sugar glider, Petaurus breviceps LC

Order: Cetacea (whales) 

The order Cetacea includes whales, dolphins and porpoises. They are the mammals most fully adapted to aquatic life with a spindle-shaped nearly hairless body, protected by a thick layer of blubber, and forelimbs and tail modified to provide propulsion underwater.

Suborder: Mysticeti
Family: Balaenopteridae
Subfamily: Balaenopterinae
Genus: Balaenoptera
 Rorqual baleen whale: either Bryde's whale, Balaenoptera brydei or sei whale, B. borealis DD
Subfamily: Megapterinae
Genus: Megaptera
 Humpback whale, Megaptera novaeangliae VU
Suborder: Odontoceti
Superfamily: Platanistoidea
Family: Ziphidae
Subfamily: Hyperoodontinae
Genus: Mesoplodon
 Blainville's beaked whale, Mesoplodon densirostris DD
Family: Physeteridae
Genus: Physeter
 Sperm whale, Physeter macrocephalus vulnerable species VU
Family: Delphinidae (marine dolphins)
Genus: Peponocephala
 Melon-headed whale, Peponocephala electra LC (now rarely found in the Solomon Islands)
Genus: Globicephala
 Short-finned pilot whale, Globicephala macrorhynchus DD
Genus: Steno
 Rough-toothed dolphin, Steno bredanensis LC 
Genus: Stenella
 Pantropical spotted dolphin, Stenella attenuata LC
 Striped dolphin, Stenella coeruleoalba LC
 Spinner dolphin, Stenella longirostris DD
Genus: Lagenodelphis
 Fraser's dolphin, Lagenodelphis hosei LC
Genus: Grampus
 Risso's dolphin, Grampus griseus LC
Genus: Tursiops
 Common bottlenose dolphin, Tursiops truncatus LC
 Indo-Pacific bottlenose dolphin, Tursiops aduncus NT
Genus: Feresa
 Pygmy killer whale, Feresa attenuata DD
Genus: Pseudorca
 False killer whale, Pseudorca crassidens DD
Genus: Orcinus
 Orca, Orcinus orca DD

See also
List of chordate orders
Lists of mammals by region
List of prehistoric mammals
Mammal classification
List of mammals described in the 2000s

Notes

References
 

Solomon Islands

Mammals
Solomon Islands